Erasma Moreno  (born ) is a Dominican Republic female volleyball player. She is part of the Dominican Republic women's national volleyball team.

With her club Mirador she competed at the 2015 FIVB Volleyball Women's Club World Championship.

References

1991 births
Living people
Dominican Republic women's volleyball players
Place of birth missing (living people)
Wing spikers